The first season of Philippines' Next Top Model aired from March 13, 2007 to June 12, 2007 on RPN.

The international destination for this season was Hong Kong.

The winner of the competition was 22-year old Grendel Alvarado from Arayat, Pampanga.

Cast

Contestants
(Ages stated are at start of contest)

Judge
 Ruffa Gutierrez-Bektas (host)
 Wilma Doesnt
 Pauline Sauco-Juan
 Robbie Carmona
 Vince Uy
 Xander Angeles

Results

 The contestant was eliminated
 Indicates that the contestant quit the competition
 Indicates the contestant was part of a non-elimination bottom two
 The contestant won the competition

Average call-out order

Bottom two

References

External links
 Official website (archive at the Wayback Machine)

Top Model
2007 Philippine television seasons
Television shows filmed in Hong Kong